{{DISPLAYTITLE:O2 Xda}}
The O2 Xda brand was a range of Windows Mobile PDA phones, marketed by O2, developed by O2 Asia and manufactured by multiple OEMs (mainly HTC, Quanta and Arima). The first model was released in June 2002. The last models came to market in 2008. The "X" represents convergence of voice and information/data within one product; the "DA" stands for "Digital Assistant", as in PDA. The name of XDA Developers is derived from it.

Retired models

Xda

The first product released in the XDA range.

 206 MHz Intel SA-1110 microprocessor
 Initial models had 32 MB RAM, which was quickly increased to 64 MB
 240×320 color touchscreen (12bit) 4096 colors
 I/O: cable (USB, RS-232), IrDA & SD flash card
 Dual-band 900/1800 MHz radio
 HTC codename: HTC Wallaby

Xda II
The successor to the Xda, the Xda II, was released in November 2003.

 Intel XScale PXA263 (400 MHz)
 128 MB SDRAM, 64 MB ROM
 3.5" Transflective 65,536 colour LCD (240×320 pixels)
 I/O: cable (USB, RS-232), IrDA, Bluetooth, SD flash card & SDIO flash card
 Integral VGA camera (640×480 pixels)
 HTC codename: HTC Andes, but variants were known as HTC Himalaya

Xda II Mini
 Intel Xscale PXA272 (416 MHz)
 64 MB SDRAM, 64 MB ROM
 2.8" Transflective 65,536 colour LCD (240×320 pixels)
 I/O: cable (USB), IrDA, Bluetooth, SD & Secure
 HTC codename: HTC Magician

Xda IIi
The Xda IIi was released in February 2005.

 Intel Xscale PXA272 (520 MHz)
 128 MB SDRAM, 128 MB ROM
 3.5" Transflective 65,536 colour LCD (240x320 pixels)
 1.3 MP Camera
 HTC codename: HTC Alpine

Xda IIs
The Xda IIs was released in November 2004. O2 Germany released the device as Xda III.

 Intel Xscale PXA263 (400 MHz)
 128 MB SDRAM, 96 MB ROM (44 MB available)
 QVGA 3.5" Transflective 65,536 colour LCD (240x320 pixels)
 I/O: cable (USB, RS-232), IrDA, Bluetooth, SD & SDIO flash card, and integrated Wireless LAN (802.11b)
 Integral 0.3 MP camera, VGA 640x480 pixels
 Quad band (GSM 850/900/1800/1900)
 Battery: 8500mh
 Weight: 205 g
 Size: 12.5 x 7.2 x 1.9 cm
 Slide out keyboard 39-key QWERTY keyboard
 Stand-by Up to 168 h
 Talk time Up to 4 h
 HTC codename: HTC Blueangel

Xda IQ
The Xda IQ was released in 2005 and runs Windows Mobile 5 Smartphone Edition.

 Texas Instruments OMAP 850 CPU (200 MHz)
 128 MB SDRAM, 64 MB ROM
 2.2" QVGA screen, 64K colour TFT LCD (240x320 pixels)
 I/O: cable (USB, RS-232), IrDA, Bluetooth, SD & SDIO flash card, and integrated Wireless LAN (802.11b)
 Integral 1.3 MP camera
 Quad band (GSM 850/900/1800/1900)
 Battery: 1150 mAh
 Weight: 110g
 Size: 4.6 x 10.9 x 1.8 cm
 HTC codename: HTC Tornado

Xda Exec
The Xda Exec was released in July 2005 and is the first Xda to run Windows Mobile 5, with highest speed processor at the time.
 Intel Bulverde 520 MHz
 64 MB SDRAM, 128 MB ROM
 3.6" Transflective 65,536 colour LCD (0.3M pixels, 640×480 pixel, 180° Pivot / Clamshell)
 I/O: cable (USB, RS-232), IrDA, Bluetooth, MMC & SDIO flash card, and integrated Wireless LAN (802.11b)
 Built-in 62 key QWERTY keyboard (Backlight Blue)
 Built-in 1.3 MP CMOS Camera with LED flash light - Can compose 2 MP 1600×1280 Image file, MPEG4 Video
 Dual integrated cameras, both for still picture and video
 3 programmable buttons, 2 phone buttons, 5-way navigation button, Volume up/down button (2-way)
 Tri-band 900/1800/1900 MHz
 UMTS 2100 MHz
 Wireless data manager (UMTS/GSM/GPRS, Bluetooth, 802.11b)
 Support SMS, MMS.
 Voice Dialer
 Microsoft Messaging and Security Feature Pack (MSFP) allowing Direct Push Email, Wireless Calendar, Contacts, Tasks, Global Address List (GAL) Lookup and Security Policies after ROM update
 BlackBerry Connect software provided by official website
 Act as a wireless modem through USB, Bluetooth or IR
 Standby Time: up to 200 hours. Talk Time: up to 4 hours for the included removable and chargeable Lithium-Ion Polymer Battery, 1620 mAh
 Size: 79 (W) x 130 (L) x 21 (D) mm approx. Weight: 285g
 HTC codename: HTC Universal

Only released in Europe.

Xda Mini S

The Xda Mini S was released shortly after the Xda Exec, and was the second Xda to run Windows Mobile 5.

 TI OMP 850 200 MHz
 64 MB SDRAM, 128 MB ROM
 2.8" Transflective 64K colour LCD (1.3 MP)
 I/O: cable (USB, RS-232), IrDA, Bluetooth v2.0, miniSD flash card, and integrated Wireless LAN (802.11b/g)
 Left Side, Slide-Out 39 key Qwerty Keyboard
 Camera 1.3 MP
 Quad band (GSM 850/900/1800/1900)
 HTC codename: HTC Prodigy / HTC Wizard. Wizard has a squarer cosmetic shell than the Prodigy.

Xda Atom
The Xda Atom is the latest Model to be released in Asia. It runs Windows Mobile 5 and has approximately the same dimensions as the Xda mini, but has much improved features.

 Intel PXA272 416 MHz
 64 MB RAM, 128 MB Flash ROM
 2.7" Transflective 262K color LCD (65,536 effective)
 I/O: cable (USB), IrDA, Bluetooth, miniSD flash card, and integrated Wireless LAN (802.11b)
 Camera Colour 2 MP CMOS camera
 Tri-band GSM/GPRS/EDGE
 Atom is manufactured by Quanta Computer, the first Xda not to come from the HTC stable of Taiwan

The Xda Atom was released in Asia-Pacific region only.

Xda Atom Exec

General 2G Network GSM 900 / 1800 / 1900
Announced June 2006
Status Discontinued
Size Dimensions 102 x 58 x 18.5 mm
Weight 140 g
Display Type TFT resistive touchscreen, 256K colors (65K effective)
Size 240 x 320 pixels, 2.7 inches
Handwriting recognition
Sound Alert types Vibration; Downloadable polyphonic, MP3, AAC ringtones
Speakerphone  Yes, with stereo speakers
Memory Phonebook Practically unlimited entries and fields, Photocall
Call records Practically unlimited
Internal 64 MB RAM, 192 MB ROM
Card slot miniSD
Data GPRS Class 10 (4+1/3+2 slots), 32 - 48 kbit/s
EDGE Class 10, 236.8 kbit/s
3G No
WLAN Wi-Fi 802.11b
Bluetooth Yes, v1.2
Infrared port Yes
USB Yes, miniUSB
Camera Primary 2 MP, 1600x1200 pixels, LED flash
Video Yes
Secondary No
Features OS Microsoft Windows Mobile 5.0 PocketPC
CPU Intel XScale PXA 27x 520 MHz processor
Messaging SMS, MMS, Email, Instant Messaging
Browser WAP 2.0/xHTML, HTML (PocketIE)
Radio FM radio
Games Solitaire and Jawbreaker
Colors Silver
GPS No
Java Yes, MIDP 2.0
Pocket Office (Word, Excel, PowerPoint, PDF viewer)
MP3/AAC/AAC+/WMA/OGG/AMR player
WMV/MP4 player
Battery   Standard battery, Li-Po 1530 mAh

Xda Neo

The Xda Neo was launched by O2 Germany at the CeBIT show in March 2006. Its shape and size are very similar to those of the Xda II mini.

 Texas Instruments OMAP850 195 MHz
 64 MB SDRAM, 128 MB ROM
 2.8" Transflective 65K colour LCD
 I/O: cable (USB, RS-232), IrDA, Bluetooth v2.0, SD flash card, and integrated Wireless LAN (802.11b/g)
 Camera 2MP
 Quad band (GSM 850/900/1800/1900)
 HTC codename: HTC Prophet

Xda Trion
Announced in May 2006, it  will be the second 3G-enabled model in the xda range. Like the Exec, it will have two CMOS cameras - a VGA camera on the front for video calls, and a 2-megapixel camera on the back. Other hardware specifications are very similar to the ones of the Mini S.

 Samsung 400 MHz
 64 MB SDRAM, 128 MB ROM
 2.8" Transflective 65K colour LCD (1.3 MP)
 I/O: cable (USB, RS-232), IrDA, Bluetooth v2.0, microSD flash card, and integrated Wireless LAN (802.11b/g)
 Camera 2MP
 Left Side, Slide-Out 39 key Qwerty Keyboard
 Quad band (GSM 850/900/1800/1900)
 UMTS 2100 MHz
 HTC codename: HTC Hermes

Xda Graphite
This candybar sized phone was announced in March 2007 and supports both 3G and WiFi.
 Windows mobile 5.0 or 6.0
 64 MB RAM, 128 MB ROM, MiniSD expandable memory
 Marvell PXA 270 416 MHz processor
 2MP camera with front-facing VGA camera for video calling, White LED strobe flash
 109.5 x 46.9 x 18 mm, Weight with battery: 105g
 2.2" QVGA 65k colour LCD display
 Also known as the ASUS Jupiter
A ROM upgrade is available on the O2 website for Windows Mobile 6

Xda Stealth
The O2 Xda Stealth was O2's attempt to make a normal mobile phone with GPS while still having full Windows Mobile and PIM Capabilities. This phone has mostly generated average reviews.

Microsoft Windows Mobile 5.0 PocketPC with phone edition, incorporating Windows Mobile messenger and security pack
64 MB RAM, 192 MB ROM, MiniSD expandable memory
Intel XScale PXA 272 416 MHz processor
Internal GPS antenna
2MP CMOS camerawith auto focus (1st camera pda with auto-focus), White LED strobe flash
Triband GSM 900 / GSM 1800 / GSM 1900
110 x 53 x 22.5 mm, Weight with battery: 140g
Comes with a slide down number keypad.
Built-in Wireless LAN 802.11b/g, Bluetooth, USB 1.2
2.4" TFT LCD display with touch screen
240 x 320 dots resolution, 65K colour screen
Manufactured by Gigabyte Communications.

XDA Flame

The XDA Flame is the first dual processor PDA-phone announced by O2 in late 2006 and contains enhanced screen graphics, movie playback, photo viewing, and gaming performance.

3.6" VGA touch screen
Intel Xscale(R) PXA 270 processor at 520 MHz.
2.0 Mega Pixel camera with Auto-Focus
NVIDIA(R) GoForce(R) 5500 GPU
Wireless LAN 802.11b/g
SRS Mobile HD surround sound
USB On-The-Go
2 GB Flash ROM + 128 MB RAM
TV out connector (NTSC Only)
Windows Mobile 5 Professional
Bluetooth 2.0
Micro SD expansion slot
3G - Tri band phone
Second camera for video chatting
Built-in flash for the main camera
Built-in FM tuner
Business card reader
Weight: 190g
Infrared [Usable as a remote control for appliances such as a TV or Hi-fi]

Xda Atom Life
Xda Atom Life is one of the fastest HSDPA 3.5G PDAphones, announced by O2 in early 2007 and has enhanced multimedia capabilities. It also has Windows Mobile 6.0 operating system, the upgrade from WM5.0.

Intel XScale(R) PXA 270 processor at 624 MHz
1 GB Flash ROM + 64 MB RAM
2.0 Mega Pixel camera with Macro Mode feature
Wireless LAN 802.11b/g
Bluetooth 1.2
SRS Mobile HD surround sound
Equalizer controls
Windows Mobile 6.0
Mini SD expansion slot with miniSDHC support
3.5G - Tri band phone
Second front-facing VGA camera for video calling
Built-in flash (Twin White LED Strobe Flash) for the main camera
Built-in FM tuner with RDS feature
O2 exclusive applications like O2 Media Plus
Dimensions: 106(L) x 58(W) x 18(T) mm
Weight: 145g

Xda Zest
The Xda Zest is an O2 branded Asus P565 handset. The Zest was released in November 2008. It has a 3.2Mp camera, 802.11b/g WiFi, HSDPA, GPS, and 2.8 inch 65k colour touchscreen with a resolution of 640x480 pixels.

Xda Serra
The Xda Serra is an O2 branded version of the HTC Touch Pro handset was released in November 2008.

Xda Ignito
The Xda Ignito is an O2 branded version of the HTC Touch Diamond handset was released in August 2008.

Xda Mantle

The Xda Mantle is an O2 branded version of the HTC P6500 handset and was released in July 2008.

 Windows Mobile 6
 128 MB RAM, 256 MB ROM
 400 MHz ARM 11
 GPS Receiver
 Quad band
 3.5" touch screen
 HSDPA, EDGE and 3G.
 Fingerprint feature, barcode reader .

Xda Orbit 2

Microsoft Windows Mobile 6 Professional
128 MB RAM, 256 MB ROM
Qualcomm MSM7200 400 MHz
GPS Receiver
FM Radio
3MP Camera
Quad band (GSM 850/900/1800/1900)
58 x 110 x 15.5mm, 130 grams
TFT touchscreen 65K colors, 240 x 320 pixels, 2.8 inches
MicroSD card slot
Gprs Class 10, Edge Class 10, 802.11b/g Wi-Fi, Bluetooth V2
Manufacturer: High Tech Computer (HTC)
HTC codename: HTC Polaris 100 (P3650) (sometimes just called Polaris) (Model also branded as HTC Touch Cruise)

Xda Stellar
The Xda Stellar was released on 26 November 2007.

Microsoft Windows Mobile 6 Professional
128 MB RAM, 256 MB ROM
Qualcomm MSM7200 400 MHz processor
GPS Receiver (SIRF Star III)
3MP Camera
3G, Quad band, WLAN
59 x 112 x 18.6 mm, 190 grams
2.8", QVGA, 64k colour screen
MicroSD card slot
Based on the HTC TyTN II.

References

External links
 Official O2 Xda site

Smartphones
HTC mobile phones
Windows Mobile Professional devices
Windows Mobile Standard devices
Xda